The 2013 IIHF World Championship Division II was a pair of international Ice hockey tournaments run by the International Ice Hockey Federation. Group A was contested in Zagreb, Croatia, running from 14 to 20 April 2013 and Group B was contested in İzmit, Turkey, running from 21 to 27 April 2013. Divisions II A and II B represent the fourth and the fifth tier of the Ice Hockey World Championships.

Division II A

Participants

Officials

Referees
  Alexandre Bourreau
  Gergely Kincses
  Daniel Gamper
  Marc Wiegand

Linesmen
  Florian Hofer
  Andrei Haurylenka
  Cao Jian
  Trpimir Piragić
  Marko Saković
  James Kavanagh
  Mihai-Ariel Trandafir

Final standings

Results
All times are local (CEST – UTC+2).

Statistics

Top 10 scorers

IIHF.com

Goaltending leaders
(minimum 40% team's total ice time)

IIHF.com

Tournament awards
Best players selected by the directorate:
Best Goaltender:  Bjorn Steijlen
Best Defenceman:  Andy Sertich
Best Forward:  Joel Prpic
IIHF.com

Division II B

Participants

Officials

Referees
  Vladimir Nalivaiko
  Tim Tzirtziganis
  Igor Tsernyshov
  Viki Trilar

Linesmen
  Mart Eerme
  Mathieu Loos
  Mergen Kaydarov
  Tibor Fazekas
  Sergio Biec Cebrian
  Erhan Bulut
  Cemal Ersin Kaya

Final standings

Results
All times are local (EEST – UTC+3).

Statistics

Top 10 scorers

IIHF.com

Goaltending leaders
(minimum 40% team's total ice time)

IIHF.com

Tournament awards
 Best players selected by the directorate:
 Best Goaltender:  Avihu Sorotzky
Best Defenceman:  Berton Haines
Best Forward:  Brian Arroyo
IIHF.com

References

External links
IIHF.com

IIHF World Championship Division II
3
World Championship Division II
World
2013 IIHF World Championship Division II
2013 IIHF World Championship Division II
Sport in İzmit